Five referendums were held in Switzerland during 1931. The first was held on 8 February on a federal resolution on a petition for a referendum on article 12 of the constitution concerning bans on religious orders, and was approved by a majority of voters and cantons. The second and third were held on 15 March on revising article 72 of the constitution concerning the election of the National Council and on revising article 76, 96 and 105 on the legislative term. Both were approved. The fourth and fifth were held on 6 December on a federal law on aged and bereavement insurance and a federal law on tobacco taxation. Both were rejected.

Background
The February and March referendums were "obligatory", requiring a double majority; a majority of the popular vote and majority of the cantons. The decision of each canton was based on the vote in that canton. Full cantons counted as one vote, whilst half cantons counted as half. The December referendums were "optional", and required only a majority of the public vote.

Results

February: Petition for a referendum on article 12

March: Election of the National Council

March: Legislative terms

December: Aged and bereavement insurance

December: Tobacco tax

References

1931 referendums
1931 in Switzerland
Referendums in Switzerland